Curtis King may refer to:

 Curtis King (baseball) (born 1970), former pitcher in Major League Baseball
 Curtis King (politician), American politician in the Washington State Senate
 Curtis King Jr., singer on The Raccoons, a Canadian animated television series

See also
 King Curtis, American saxophonist